Euphorbia characias, the Mediterranean spurge or Albanian spurge, is a species of flowering plant in the family Euphorbiaceae typical of the Mediterranean vegetation.

Description
It has many woolly stems and characteristic black or dark brown nectar glands in the cyathia, which are borne in dense spherical clusters, from spring to early summer. The fruits are smooth capsules. It is a tough plant, capable of resisting long periods of drought. It grows preferably in dry areas, often far away from the water table, both in flat as well as in mountainous terrain. This plant can also resist high salinity.

Subspecies
Two main subspecies are found in different regions of the Mediterranean Basin. These often overlap in the western areas of distribution: 
 E. characias subsp. characias (s). From Portugal to Crete 
 E. characias subsp. wulfenii (Hoppe ex W.D.J.Koch) Radcl.-Sm. 1968 (s). From Southern France to Anatolia.

Cultivation
Euphorbia characias is valued as an ornamental plant for its ability to survive drought and its groundcovering capabilities. It is suitable for any location, sheltered or exposed, in light soil in full sun.

Cultivars
Garden cultivars are sold under the names ‘Black Pearl’, ‘Thelma's Giant’, ‘Lambrook Gold’, ‘Silver Swan’ and ‘Tasmanian Tiger’, among others. They come in a variety of colors, from silvery grey and bluish green to greenish yellow. These garden varieties are valued in Mediterranean or desert landscaping for not being highly demanding and for looking good despite lack of watering in sunny areas.

The following cultivars have gained the Royal Horticultural Society's Award of Garden Merit:- 

 ‘Tasmanian Tiger’ 
 ‘Whistleberry Garnet’ 
 E. characias subsp. characias ‘Blue Hills’ 
 E. characias subsp. wulfenii ‘Jimmy Platt’

Uses
This plant also has uses in traditional medicine; like many other species of genus Euphorbia its toxic white and sticky sap has been used to treat skin excrescences, like cancers, tumors, and warts, since ancient times.

Gallery

References

Seidel, Denkwart. Blumen am Mittelmeer, München 2002,

External links

Teresa Franquesa i Codinach, El paisatge vegetal de la península del Cap de Creus 
UIB - Herbari virtual - Euphorbia characias L. subsp. characias

characias
Plants described in 1753
Taxa named by Carl Linnaeus